The Synchronized Swimming competition at the 2007 World Aquatics Championships was held from March 17 to March 24.

Medal table

Medal summary

 
2007 in synchronized swimming
Synchronized Swimming
Synchronised swimming at the World Aquatics Championships